Pinch-induced behavioural inhibition (PIBI), also called dorsal immobility, transport immobility or clipnosis, is a partially inert state which results from a gentle squeeze of the skin behind the neck.  It is mostly observed among cats and allows a female cat to carry her kitten easily with her jaws. It can be used to restrain most cats effectively in a domestic or veterinary context. The phenomenon also occurs in other animals, such as squirrels and mice.

See also
Scruff
Tonic immobility (Animal hypnosis)

References

Felinology
Mammal behavior